Amadeo, officially the Municipality of Amadeo,  is a 4th class municipality in the province of Cavite, Philippines. According to the 2020 census, it has a population of 41,901 people.

Etymology
The town got its name after King Amadeo I of Spain.

History
On February 15, 1989, Mayor Jeremias Villanueva was washing his car in front of his rented townhouse in Las Piñas, Metro Manila, when he and his security man Virgilio Lascano were assassinated by three gunmen riding a vehicle. Four suspects, including a Manila policeman from Amadeo, were later captured in Parañaque a month later on March 16, and by next day, the National Bureau of Investigation (NBI) confirmed that the assassination was ordered by Villanueva's political rival, former Mayor Reynaldo Bayot.

Geography

Barangays
Amadeo is politically subdivided into 26 barangays (12 urban, 14 rural).

Climate

Demographics

Economy

Culture
Amadeo is best known for its Pahimis Festival, which showcases the town's coffee industry. It is usually held on the last weekend of February and its town fiesta is held on the last Sunday of April.

References

External links

Pahimis Festival
[ Philippine Standard Geographic Code]
Philippine Census Information

Municipalities of Cavite